The Malawi national basketball team represents Malawi in international competitions. It is administrated by the Basketball Association of Malawi-BASMAL.

Founded in 1988, Team Malawi is one of FIBA's young members. It has attempted to qualify for the African Basketball Championship several times but waits for its breakthrough.

Roster
Team for the AfroBasket 2011 qualification.

Competitions

Performance at Summer Olympics
yet to qualify

Performance at World championships
yet to qualify

Performance at FIBA Africa Championship
yet to qualify

See also
Malawi women's national basketball team
Malawi national under-19 basketball team

References

External links
Malawi Basketball Records at FIBA Archive
Presentation on Facebook

Men's national basketball teams
Basketball
Basketball in Malawi
Basketball teams in Malawi
1988 establishments in Malawi